The 2021 IIHF Women's U18 World Championship was scheduled to be the 14th Women's U18 World Championship in ice hockey.

On 17 September 2020, all tournaments were cancelled by the IIHF due to the COVID-19 pandemic.

Top Division

Preliminary round
All times are local (UTC+1).

Group A

Group B

Division I

Group A
The tournament would have been held in Győr, Hungary from 10 to 16 January 2021.

 – Promoted from Division I B
 – Relegated from Top Division

Group B
The tournament would have been held in Radenthein, Austria from 10 to 16 January 2021.

 – Promoted from Division II A
 – Relegated from Division I A

Division II

Group A
The tournament would have been held in Dumfries, Great Britain from 19 to 22 January 2021.
 – Relegated from Division I B

 – Promoted from Division II B

Group B
The tournament would have been held in İzmit, Turkey from 28 to 31 January 2021.
 – Relegated from Division II A

References

External links
Official website

IIHF World Women's U18 Championships
2020–21 in women's ice hockey
IIHF
IIHF
International ice hockey competitions hosted by Sweden
Sports competitions in Linköping
IIHF World Women's U18 Championship